Dastjerd is a village in Bam Rural District, Bam and Safiabad District, Esfarayen County, North Khorasan Province, Iran. At the 2006 census, its population was 569, in 162 families.

References 

Populated places in Esfarayen County